The Miss Hong Kong Pageant, or Miss HK for short, is an annual beauty pageant organised by local Hong Kong television station, TVB. The pageant was established in 1946, and acquired by TVB in 1973.

The current Miss Hong Kong is Denice Lam (林鈺洧) who was crowned at the 50th Miss Hong Kong 2022 Pageant on 25 September 2022.  This year 2022 marks the 50th edition of the Miss Hong Kong Pageant under its acquisition by TVB in 1973.

Recruitment

All participants have to have a Hong Kong ID or be born in Hong Kong (with a valid birth certificate). The age requirement is 17–27 as of 2011, though the upper age was previously up to 25. While there has been other Miss Hong Kong pageants in prior years producing notable titleholders such as Judy Dan (1952), Virginia June Lee (1954), Michelle Mok (1958), Laura da Costa (1967), Mabel Hawkett (1970) and Shirley Yu (1974, contest organized by Miss Pearl of the Orient Company and overlapping with TVB's), the current annual TVB pageant began in 1973. Apart from the top prize winner, first runner-up and second runner-up prizes, the pageant also has other consolation prizes that vary slightly from year to year. Many Miss Hong Kong contestants have gone on to have movie careers as it is quite typical for the top contestants to garner television contracts from TVB.
Overseas Recruitment: Applications are available in New York City, Los Angeles, San Francisco, any TVB rental store in the US, Fairchild TV station, Ontario, Richmond, British Columbia, and any TVB rental store in Canada. Delegates have to send in their applications before the deadline. TVB, organisers of the pageant travel to cities in the US and Canada. They include: Los Angeles, San Francisco, Toronto, and Vancouver. TVB would choose a certain amount of delegates to interview and would call them to interview. Besides personal interviews, delegates have to wear swimsuits chosen by themselves and walk around in it. Delegates are chosen and return to Hong Kong in late May to compete.
 Local Recruitment: Hong Kong. Applications are available in Hong Kong, Australia, New Zealand, Singapore, United Kingdom, and Europe. Delegates have to send in their applications before the deadline. Weeks later, primary and secondary interviews are conducted. Top interviewed finalists are chosen and they record a reality TV show (like 2006) to choose the deserving semifinalists to compete. They joined the overseas delegates to form the top event finalists.

The pageant is traditionally televised into two events, although this is not always necessarily the case in recent years. First, a preliminary event is held where 12 finalists are selected from a group of candidates, the number of which is usually around 20–25 (with 30 being the maximum). Then a final event is held, culminating in the announcement of the winner and the first and second runners-up from the 12 finalists. In some years, the field is narrowed down to a final 5, from which the runners-up and winner are chosen. Often several contestants dropped out of the pageant before the televised preliminary, thus there would be a candidate with #30 assigned to her, but only 25 or so contestants.

Summary of winners

Overseas contestant awards list

Starting from 1991, the Miss Hong Kong pageant greets delegates from overseas. They include Toronto, Vancouver, New York, Los Angeles, Seattle, and San Francisco. Local contestants coming from Malaysia, Australia, New Zealand, London, and more enter at Hong Kong. The overseas delegates wait for the notification of their regional sponsors of TVB and if they are chosen, they fly to Hong Kong to compete. The following is a record of overseas delegates' performance at Miss Hong Kong.

 1991 – 7. Amy Kwok 郭藹明 (Los Angeles)
Winner
Miss International Goodwill
Miss Humorous Conversation
 1991 – 13. Maur Yeung 楊凱斯 (Los Angeles)
 Miss Congeniality
 1992 – 8. Patsy Lau 劉殷伶 (Los Angeles)
1st runner-up
Miss International Goodwill
 1992 – 14. Carol Lee 李秋林 (Los Angeles)
Miss Congeniality
 1993 – 20. Christina Lau 劉飛飛 (Los Angeles)
Miss International Goodwill
 1994 – 18. Dorothy Ng 吳素珊 (Los Angeles)
Miss International Goodwill
 1995 – 12. Winnie Young 楊婉儀 (San Francisco)
Winner
Most Standard Figure Award
 1997 – 2. Virginia Yung 翁嘉穗 (Vancouver)
Winner
Miss Photogenic
Miss Oriental Charm
Miss Cosmopolitan
 1997 – 12. Vivian Lee 李明慧 (Vancouver)
1st runner-up
Miss International Goodwill
 1998 – 20. Anne Heung 向海嵐 (Vancouver)
Winner
Miss Photogenic
Global Beauty Award
Miss Hospitality
 1998 – 14. Josephine Yan 殷莉 (Los Angeles)
Miss International Goodwill
 1999 – 12. Sonija Kwok 郭羨妮 (Vancouver)
Winner
Miss Photogenic
Miss International Goodwill
Miss Millennium Wisdom
 1999 – 15. Cindy Wong 王倩 (Los Angeles)
Miss Beautiful Legs
 2000 – 11. Vivian Lau 劉慧蘊 (Vancouver)
Winner
Miss Photogenic
Miss International Goodwill
Miss Millennium Charm
 2000 – 17. Margaret Kan 簡佩堅 (Toronto)
First runner-up
 2000 – 5. Maree Lau 劉嘉慧 (Sydney)
Second runner-up
 2002 – 11. Tiffany Lam 林敏俐 (San Francisco)
Winner
Miss International Goodwill
Miss New Generational Beauty
 2002 – 20.Cerina Da Graça 嘉碧儀 (Phoenix)
Miss Photogenic
Breakthrough Natural Skin Award
Slimming Beauty Award
 2003 – 2. Mandy Cho 曹敏莉 (San Francisco)
Winner
Miss International Goodwill
Miss Swimsuit Charm
Diamond Skin Award
Perfect Group
 2003 – 11. Rabee'a Yeung 楊洛婷 (Vancouver)
1st runner-up
Tourism Ambassador Award
 2003 – 18. Selena Li 李詩韻 (Toronto)
Miss Photogenic
Miss Talent
 2004 – 1. Queenie Chu 朱慧敏 (Seattle)
1st runner-up
Tourism Ambassador Award
2006 – 13. Aimee Chan 陳茵媺  (Toronto)
Winner
Miss International Goodwill
Audience Favourite
 2006 – 15. Janet Chow 周家蔚(Toronto)
1st runner-up
Miss Photogenic
2007 – 3. Kayi Cheung 張嘉兒  (Vancouver)
Winner
Miss Vitality Ambassador
2007 – 9. Grace Wong 王君馨 (New York City)
1st runner-up
Miss Photogenic
Miss International Goodwill.
2007 – 7. Lorretta Chow 周美欣 (Vancouver)
2nd runner-up
Most Attractive Legs Award
2008 – 7. Hilda Leung 梁雅琳 (Toronto)
Miss Trendy Vision
2009 – 10. Germaine Li 李姿敏 (New York City)
1st runner-up
2009 – 8. Mizuni Hung 熊穎詩 (Vancouver)
 2nd runner-up
Miss Trendy Vision
2010 – 9. Crystal Li 李雪瑩 (London)
Miss Photogenic
2011 – 14. Hymen Chu 朱希敏 (Toronto)
1st runner-up
2011 – 3. Whitney Hui 許亦妮 (London)
 2nd runner-up
Miss Photogenic
 2012 – Carat Cheung 張名雅 (Vancouver)
Winner
Aviation Ambassador
Miss International Goodwill
 2012 – Jacqueline Wong 黃心穎 (Vancouver)
1st runner up
 2012 – Tracy Chu 朱千雪 (Vancouver)
2nd runner up
 2013 – 17. Grace Chan 陳凱琳 (Vancouver)
Winner
Miss Photogenic
 2014 – 15. Veronica Shiu 邵珮詩 (Vancouver)
Winner
Miss Photogenic
Miss Friendship
 2016 – 2. Tiffany Lau 劉穎璇 (Los Angeles)
1st Runner up
Miss Photogenic
2016 – 7. Bonnie Chan 陳雅思 (Toronto)
2nd Runner up
 2017 – 5. Juliette Louie 雷莊𠒇 (Edmonton)
Winner
Miss Photogenic
 2017 – 4. Emily Wong 黃瑋琦 (Miami)
2nd Runner up
 2018 – 7. Sara Ting 丁子田 (Chicago)
2nd Runner up
 2018 – 8. Claudia Chan 陳靜堯 (Auckland)
Miss Friendship
 2019 – 6. Blossom Chan 陳熙蕊 (Brisbane) 
Miss Friendship
 2020 – 8. Lisa Tse 謝嘉怡 (Scotland)
Winner
Miss Photogenic
Notice that Vancouver has the most Miss Hong Kong winners from the overseas. They had a record of four consecutive winners from 1997 to 2000, and three consecutive winners from 2012 to 2014. In 2012, the top 3 delegates were all from Vancouver. Even though the 2007 pageant had the top 3 all from the US and Canada but Grace Wong and Lorretta Chow travelled to Hong Kong to compete in the pageant, so they are recognised by TVB to be local delegates not overseas delegates. They did however come from the overseas.

Miss World 
In 1989, TVB lost the franchise for Miss World to ATV, and held it back from 1992 to 2015.

Color key

Miss Universe 
In 2001, TVB lost the franchise for Miss Universe.

Color key

Miss International 
In 2015, TVB lost the franchise for Miss International.

Color key

Miss Chinese International Pageant
Color key

See also

Miss Asia Pageant
Miss Chinese Toronto Pageant
Miss Chinese (Vancouver) Pageant
Mr. Hong Kong – The male pageant.
"Un banc, un arbre, une rue" – The adapted theme song for the pageant.

Notes

References

External links 
 Official homepage
 Johnny's Pageant Page ~ A Complete Listing of Miss Hong Kong Contestants & Award Winners
 Wai Yin Association

Hong Kong
Hong Kong-related lists
TVB original programming
Beauty pageants in Hong Kong
1946 establishments in Hong Kong
Hong Kong